Polly Perkins (born Gillian Nessie Arnold, 31 May 1943) is a British actress, singer and writer. Perkins rose to fame in the 1960s as a popstar, going on to regularly appear in theatre and cabaret throughout the UK. She is known for playing Rose Cotton, the half-sister of Dot Cotton (June Brown), in the BBC soap opera EastEnders between 2011 and 2012.

Early and personal life
Perkins was born Gillian Nessie Arnold to theatrical parents Dickie and Mitzi, who both had a successful career performing a cabaret/vaudeville act. Dickie's second wife, Dottie Arnold, was also a successful variety performer. Perkins has two children, singer songwriter Tim Arnold and film producer/director Toby Tobias. In 1985, Perkins moved to Spain.

Career
Perkins started her career performing at the Windmill Theatre in Soho, when still in her teens, she first appeared nude aged 15.

During the 60's, Perkins was a teen pop star, a BBC thespian and the first compere of the cult TV show Ready Steady Go!. She starred in stage musicals as diverse as Salad Days and Let My People Come, and appeared in episodes of Minder, The Sweeney, Rules of Justice and Nanny. Perkins was the leading lady in many West End cabaret clubs including The Latin Quarter, Blue Angel, The Celebrite, The Gaslight, The Directors Lodge, The Gargoyle, The Piano Bar and Madame Jojo's. She became a much-loved figure in Soho clubs for her smoky rendition of Edith Piaf's Je Ne Regrette Rien.

She also ran and performed in her own club "Polly's Candlelight" in Mayfair throughout 1977/78.

Perkins was cast as Trish Valentine, a washed-up nightclub singer, in the BBC soap opera Eldorado in the mid-90s. In 2011, she returned to the stage in the debut performance of songs from her son's new musical Secrets of Soho at The Phoenix Artist Club.

In the movie Metropolitan by Whit Stillman there is a mentioned character named Polly Perkins although an appearance is never made.

In May 2011, it was announced by that Perkins would be joining the cast of BBC soap opera EastEnders as Rose, the estranged half-sister of Dot Branning. Speaking of her casting, Perkins said "I am thrilled to be joining the cast of EastEnders, the show is a real British institution with an extraordinary creative team. I'm really looking forward to working with June again, who I have been friends with for over 30 years."

Filmography

Television
BBC Sunday Night Play-She's A Free Country
The Colony
Menace
The Sweeney
Flickers
Rules of Justice
Nanny
Play For Today-Wayne And Albert
Eldorado
EastEnders (2011–12)

Stage
Salad Days
Let My People Come
Blood Brothers (Salon Varietés Production)

Film
Take It or Leave It
The Mumbo Jumbo

Discography

Albums 
Pop Lore According to the Academy (1969) - Reissued on CD and is available digitally.
Liberated Woman (1973)
Polly (1977)

Singles
I Reckon You (1963)
Sweet As Honey (1963)
Young Lover (1964)
I Went By Your House Today (1964)
Munching The Candy (1969)
Coochie Coo (1973)

Bibliography
Songs for the Liberated Woman (1973)
Far Too Dainty (2003)

References

External links

1943 births
Living people
English television actresses
English women singers
English film actresses
English stage actresses